Patroli (English: Patrolling) is a criminal news program that aired on Indosiar in Indonesia. This criminal news program was launched on May 3, 1999, and created by Wishnutama. It broadcasts criminal news that happens every day.

See also 

 Saksi Kunci
 Buser

References 

Indonesian television news shows
Indonesian-language television shows
1999 Indonesian television series debuts
1990s Indonesian television series
Indosiar original programming